KTTN (1600 AM) is an American radio station licensed to serve the community of Trenton, Missouri.  The station is owned by John Ausberger's PAR Broadcast Group and the broadcast license is held by Luehrs Broadcasting Company, Inc.

It broadcasts an adult contemporary music format deriving a portion of its programming from Dial Global.

The station was assigned the call sign "KTTN" by the Federal Communications Commission (FCC).

References

External links
KTTN official website

TTN
Mainstream adult contemporary radio stations in the United States
Grundy County, Missouri